USM Alger is a football club based in Algiers, Algeria that competes in Ligue 1, the most senior football league in Algeria. Since its founding in 1937, the club has had 19 different presidents, And the first president of the club is Arezki Meddad. As for the longest period as president was Saïd Allik for 16 years during which he achieved 9 titles.

History

Founder member of the club, Arezki Meddad is chosen by his peers to be the first president in the history of USMA. Arezki Meddad was the first president, but he has not been included in the prefecture. It's in his coffee, rue du Divan in the Casbah - which also housed the headquarters of the Étoile Nord-Africaine - that was created USMA. The first president was officially registered on Ali Shahid Hammar said "Ali Zaied" tortured to death in March 1957, the club was in time for the official address of coffee Benkanoun located Randon street in the Casbah. On July 5, 1987 USK Alger celebrated its 50th anniversary and the opportunity to bring everyone together has not been seized. Many of these people did not participate in this celebration. From the founding father Sid Ahmed Kemmat to the sympathetic son like Boualem Rahma the Chaabi singer, However they forgot many faces that presented to the club that the reasons the party was not complete.

Saïd Allik era
In 1994 Saïd Allik became Chairman of the Board of Directors of USM Alger and promised to return the team to Division 1, On May 26, 1995 USM Alger won against MC Ouargla and achieved an promotion challenge back to the Division 1 after five full seasons, Allik announce that USM Alger has returned to its normal place and will not fall again to the second division, In the first season in Division 1 Allik won the first title in 33 years and the second in USM Alger history. in the following season, Alik signed a contract with the JS Kabylie duo, Tarek Hadj Adlane the former player of Al Ittihad and Mahieddine Meftah the African Cup of Nations champion with Algeria national team and because of it a great enmity began between Allik and Mohand Chérif Hannachi. From 2005 to 2010, the worst of Saïd Allik's period, where USM Alger's level declined and did not achieve any title and contented itself with playing the cup final twice against traditional rivals MC Alger and was defeated in both of them, their first final defeat since 1980. It is said that the biggest reason for this decline is the support of Saïd Allik for Ali Benflis in the presidential election against President Abdelaziz Bouteflika at the time. On October 27, 2010, Haddad replaced Saïd Allik as president and owner of the club. Allik had been the club's president for the past 16 years.

ETRHB Haddad era

On August 4, 2010, USM Alger went public in conjunction with the professionalization of the domestic league. Algerian businessman Ali Haddad became the majority share owner after investing 700 million Algeria dinars to buy an 83% ownership in the club to become the first professional club in Algeria. On October 27, 2010, Haddad replaced Saïd Allik as president of the club. Allik had been the club's president for the past 18 years, On 28 February 2018 Ali Haddad he changed his brother Rabouh from a post general manager by former international player and former ES Setif president Abdelhakim Serrar. After the outbreak of protests in Algeria and the arrest of club owner Ali Haddad on corruption charges. On April 30, 2019 The board of the SSPA USMA met and noted the vacancy of the post of president of the company since the incarceration of Ali Haddad there is nearly a month. It was Boualem Chendri who was unanimously elected to succeed him while ETRHB Haddad remains the majority shareholder of the club.

Groupe SERPORT era
On June 2, 2019 it is official, the Haddad family is selling its shares in SSPA USMA which it holds 92%, It was the club's communication officer, Amine Tirmane, who announced it on the Echourouk TV. the reasons that made them make this decision is the imprisonment of club owner Ali Haddad and also freeze all financial accounts of the club. After it was expected that the general assembly of shareholders will be on March 12, 2020 it was submitted to March 2, especially after the imprisonment of the former club president, Rabouh Haddad. The meeting witnessed the attendance of ETRHB Haddad representative and the absence of the amateur club president Saïd Allik, and after two and a half hours, it was announced that Groupe SERPORT had bought the shares of ETRHB Haddad which amounted to 94.34%. 

On July 31, 2020 general manager Abdelghani Haddi spoke about some newspapers and responded to them and the fake news about the value of buying USM Alger's shares, where he said that the amount was 2 billion dinars about 13 million euros., for information SERPORT is a holding company which manages the State's holdings in Algerian port services. It generates a turnover of nearly 500 million euros per year, for a net profit which oscillates between 25 and 40 million euros. On September 10, 2021 Saadi Yacef passed away at the age of 93, who was one of the leaders of Algeria's National Liberation Front during his country's war of independence, president of the club in the seventies and honorary president. Asked on National Radio about a possible withdrawal from Groupe SERPORT, Achour Djelloul assured that the public company had no intention of separating from USM Alger. On May 12, 2022 Djelloul was dismissed from his post after the scandal of the exit of containers of Hyundai cars imported by the Tahkout company in 2019, and was replaced by the former CEO of  l’entreprise portuaire d’annaba (EPAN) Abdelkarim Harkati temporarily.

List of presidents

References

USM Alger
USM Alger